The Great American Beauty Contest is a 1973 American satirical comedy–drama television film, starring JoAnna Cameron and featuring Eleanor Parker, Robert Cummings, Louis Jourdan and Farrah Fawcett in an early film appearance.

It was directed by Robert Day and was originally shown on the ABC TV network in the United States on February 13, 1973.

Plot
A feminist enters a beauty contest, hoping to win and deliver a speech on exploitation and sexism at the end.

Cast
Eleanor Parker as Peggy Lowery
Robert Cummings as Dan Carson
Louis Jourdan as Ralph Dupree
JoAnna Cameron as Gloria Rockwell
Susan Damante as Angelique Denby
Farrah Fawcett as T L Dawson
Kathrine Baumann as Melinda Wilson
Susan Anton as previous Great American Beauty winner
Tracy Reed as Pamela Parker
Larry Wilcox as Joe Bunch
Patricia Barry as Kay Earnshaw
Christopher Norris as Miss Utah
Barbi Benton as Miss Iowa
Mady Maguire as Lib Girl

Production
The film was announced in December 1972.

"It's turning out to be great camp", said Aaron Spelling during filming.

Reception
AllMovie characterizes the film as "An unsubtle but effective TV-movie satire of the 'Miss America' syndrome", and calls the belly dance performed by Farrah Fawcett "endearingly ridiculous."

The Los Angeles Times called it "witty, perceptive."

See also
 List of American films of 1973

References

External links

The Great American Beauty Contest in New York Times

1973 television films
1973 films
1973 comedy-drama films
American satirical films
1970s feminist films
American comedy-drama television films
Films about beauty pageants
American feminist films
1970s satirical films
Films directed by Robert Day
1970s English-language films
1970s American films